GRB 111209A is the longest lasting gamma-ray burst (GRB) detected by the Swift Gamma-Ray Burst Mission, observed on December 9, 2011. Its duration is longer than 7 hours, implying this event has a different kind of progenitor than normal long GRBs. It was first proposed that the progenitor of this event was a blue supergiant star with low metallicity. Later, it was also proposed that this event is the prototype of a new class of GRBs, ultra-long GRBs.

The GRB was associated with the magnetar-powered supernova 2011kl, an object of intermediate luminosity between conventional GRB supernovae and superluminous supernovae.

See also
 List of gamma-ray bursts
 Supermassive black hole
 Tidal force

References

20111209
111209A
December 2011 events